This is a list of films set in Sicily.

 L'avventura (1960)
 Baarìa (2009)
 Divorce, Italian Style (1961)
 Il Gattopardo (1963)
 The Godfather (1972)
 The Godfather Part II (1974)
 Jessica (1962)
 Malèna (2000)
 Nuovo Cinema Paradiso (1988)
 Purple Sea (2009)
 Stromboli (1950)
 La Terra Trema (1948)

 
Sicily